The Extremaduran Wikipedia or Güiquipedia (formerly Güiquipeya) is the Extremaduran-language edition of Wikipedia, a free, online encyclopedia. It has  articles and is ranked  in the Wikipedia list according to the number of articles.

Controversy
Different media have criticized the Extremaduran version of Wikipedia. It is questioned that the Extremaduran is not really a separate language, but is instead a dialect of Asturian and Castilian, and that it does not have defined spelling rules. The fact that the page only has three main contributors, the same who initiated the project has also been the subject of controversy.

References

External links

 Extremaduran Wikipedia
 Extremaduran Wikipedia mobile

Wikipedias by language
Wikipedias in Romance languages
Internet properties established in 2007